Watchara Buathong (born April 23, 1993) is a Thai professional footballer who plays as a goalkeeper for Thai League 2 Club Nakhon Si United.

Club career 

The young goalkeeper joined a Thai Premier League club Osotspa Saraburi in 2009 at age of 16 and played for the club until 2011.

In 2012, Chainat signed him in a loan deal until the end of the 2012 season.

International career

In 2016 Watchara was selected in Thailand U23 squad for 2016 AFC U-23 Championship in Qatar.

Honours

International
Thailand U-19
 AFF U-19 Youth Championship 
  Winners (1) : 2011

Club
Port
 Thai FA Cup (1) : 2019

External links
 
 Profile at Goal
https://us.soccerway.com/players/watchara-buathong/285927/

1982 births
Living people
Watchara Buathong
Watchara Buathong
Association football goalkeepers
Watchara Buathong
Watchara Buathong
Watchara Buathong
Watchara Buathong
Watchara Buathong
Watchara Buathong
Watchara Buathong
Nakhon Si United F.C. players